James Armstrong (Abt. 1811 - December 21, 1879) was a Texan politician who served in the Texas House and Texas Senate.

Life

Early years
Armstrong was born in 1811 in Kentucky, USA. He later moved to Jasper County in 1835, where he would stay until 1840.

Politics
He served in many districts in both the Texas House and Texas Senate from 1847 to 1874.

Later years
He died of pneumonia on December 21, 1879 at Beaumont, Jefferson County, Texas at the age of 67–68.

References

1811 births
1879 deaths
Members of the Texas House of Representatives
19th-century American politicians
Texas state senators